Huang Jiaxiang (born January 1949) is a retired vice admiral (zhongjiang) of the Chinese People's Liberation Army Navy (PLAN). He attained the rank of rear admiral (shaojiang) in 2005, and was promoted to the rank of vice admiral (zhongjiang) in 2007.

Biography
Huang was born in Nanshi District, Shanghai, China in January 1949. He was raised in Qidong, Jiangsu. He enlisted in the People's Liberation Army (PLA) in February 1968, and joined the Communist Party of China in March 1969. He served in the 38th Group Army for a long time, where he was promoted to become Political Commissar in July 2001. He led the army to rescue 16 people in the 1976 Tangshan earthquake. After the Cultural Revolution,  became director of State Physical Culture and Sports Commission, Huang was appointed as secretary of its Political Department. In December 2005 he was transferred to Guangzhou Military Region and appointed Deputy Political Commissar and Political Commissar of the South Sea Fleet, serving in the post until he retirement in July 2012.

He was a delegate to the 16th National Congress of the Communist Party of China and a delegate to the 11th National People's Congress. He was a member of the 12th National Committee of the Chinese People's Political Consultative Conference.

References

1949 births
Living people
People's Liberation Army generals from Shanghai
People's Liberation Army Navy admirals